Alister Andrew Henskens  (born 30 December 1963) is an Australian politician. He has served as the New South Wales Minister for Skills and Training, the Minister for Science, Innovation and Technology, and the Leader of the House in the Legislative Assembly since December 2021 in the Perrottet ministry. He previously served as the Minister for Families, Communities and Disability Services between May and December 2021.

Henskens has been a Liberal Party member of the New South Wales Legislative Assembly since 2015, representing the electorate of electoral district of Ku-ring-gai in Sydney's upper North Shore.

Background and career 
He was born and raised in Newcastle. His father immigrated to Australia from the Netherlands in 1951 while his mother was schooled in Ku-ring-gai. Henskens studied economics and law at the University of Sydney while residing at St Andrew's College, before receiving a master's degree in law from the University of Toronto on a Rotary Scholarship. He practised as a solicitor from 1987 to 1996 and as a barrister thereafter, becoming Senior Counsel in 2011. He specialised in general commercial, insolvency, banking, defamation, building and construction law. He was a director of Basketball NSW from 1997 to 1998, and had a long involvement with local basketball organisations in Newcastle and Sydney.

He was Counsel Assisting the Equine Influenza Inquiry in 2008. Henskens also represented former NSW State Member for Terrigal, Chris Hartcher at the NSW Independent Commission Against Corruption (ICAC)'s Operation Spicer inquiry in 2014.

He was elected to the Legislative Assembly at the 2015 state election, succeeding former Premier Barry O'Farrell in the safe Liberal seat of Ku-ring-gai. He had won a closely fought Liberal preselection, with other contenders including radio presenter Jason Morrison. He was re-elected as the Member for Ku-ring-gai at the 2019 state election.

Henskens was until early 2017 the Chair of the Legislative Assembly Committee on Transport and Infrastructure, a member of the Legislation Review Committee and a member of the Committee on Investment, Industry and Regional Development. He was in 2015 the Chair of the Select Committee on the Regulation of Brothels and a member of the Joint Select Committee on Companion Animal Breeding Practices. Henskens served as the Cabinet Secretary between 24 April 2019 and 27 May 2021, having previously served as the Parliamentary Secretary for Finance, Services and Property since 1 February 2017. Henskens was appointed to Cabinet in May 2021 as Minister for Families, Communities and Disability Services, and further promoted again on 21 December 2021 as Minister for Skills and Training, the Minister for Science, Innovation and Technology, and as Leader of the House in the Legislative Assembly, in the Perrottet ministry.

Personal life 
Henskens and his wife have two children.  Henskens' niece is climate activist Violet Coco and Henskens had earlier voted in support of the antiprotest legislation that was used to sentence Coco to 15months imprisonment in December 2022.

References

 

1963 births
Living people
Members of the New South Wales Legislative Assembly
Liberal Party of Australia members of the Parliament of New South Wales
People from the North Shore, Sydney
Australian people of Dutch descent
21st-century Australian politicians
Australian Senior Counsel